Thangalperumbulam (or Thangalperumbalam) is a northern suburb of the metropolitan city of Chennai, Tamil Nadu, India.

Administration
It is a revenue village and a part of Thangalperumbulam village panchayat in Minjur block. It is administered by Ponneri taluk of Tiruvallur district.

Location
Thangalperumbulam is located in between Ennore, Pazhaverkadu and Minjur in North of Chennai. The arterial road in Thangalperumbulam is Port access road (Ennore - Pazhaverkadu road).

References

Neighbourhoods in Chennai